Edward Payne was Governor of the Bank of England from 1771 to 1773. He had been Deputy Governor from 1769 to 1771. He replaced William Cooper as Governor and was succeeded by James Sperling. Payne's tenure as Governor occurred during the Bengal bubble crash (1757–1769) and the Crisis of 1772.

See also
Chief Cashier of the Bank of England

References

External links

Governors of the Bank of England
Year of birth missing
Year of death missing
British bankers
Deputy Governors of the Bank of England